Elections to the East Kilbride District Council took place in May 1992, alongside elections to the councils of Scotland's various other districts.

Aggregate results

Ward results

Maxwellton

References

East Kilbride
East Kilbride District Council elections